Clairvaux MacKillop College is a Roman Catholic co-educational secondary school located in Upper Mount Gravatt, a suburb in the south side of Brisbane, Queensland, Australia. With a student body of over 1300, the school was founded in 1986 by the amalgamation of Clairvaux College and the MacKillop Catholic College. It houses the Edmund Rice Centre, which is used for the education of learning impaired students.

History

Clairvaux College was founded by the Christian Brothers in 1966 as a Catholic all-boys secondary school with Brother Surawski as principal. In 1971 it was decided that the all-girls Catholic secondary school St Joseph's College be moved from its current location in Holland Park to the site adjoining Clairvaux College and be renamed Mackillop College. Sister Margaret Mary Campbell was the first principal. Both schools operated as separate colleges until 1984, with some sharing of classes, teaching staff, and sports facilities. A decision was made to amalgamate the two colleges and full integration occurred in 1988 with the co-educational school renamed to Clairvaux MacKillop College.

House system

The students are divided into the following 6 houses:
Aspinall (Orange): Named after Father Kevin Aspinall, PP.
Campbell (Yellow): Named after Sister Margaret Mary Campbell, first principal of Mackillop. (formally O'Donnell)
Chisholm (Green): Named after Caroline Chisholm. (formally  Penola)
MacKillop (Red): Named after Mary MacKillop. (formally Duhig)
Rice (Blue): Named after Edmund Rice. 
Surawski (Purple): Named after Brother Surawski, the first principal of Clairvaux College.

The house system was expanded in 1995 and the six houses participate in fund raising for selected charities, vie in three inter-house sporting events annually and come together as a united college for inter-school sport events.

School laptop program

Clairvaux MacKillop has a student laptop program, in which laptops are provided for students. As of 2013, all students at the college have a laptop. Students will have the option to keep their laptops after finishing Year 12 if they pay extra fees, but otherwise must return the laptops to the school.

Notable alumni
 Mark Coyne, a rugby league player
 Peter Coyne, a rugby league player
 Bob Gallagher, 97.3 radio DJ
 Terry Hansen, comedian and 97.3 radio DJ
 Mitchell Kealey, an Australian Olympic long distance runner
 Darren Smith, a rugby league player. After his rugby career, Smith returned to the school to become a career pathways teacher
 Jason Smith, a rugby league player

References

External links
Official website

Catholic secondary schools in Brisbane
1966 establishments in Australia
Educational institutions established in 1966